Stenygra cosmocera is a species of beetle in the family Cerambycidae. It was described by White in 1855.

References

Hexoplonini
Beetles described in 1855